Bertha Coombs (born December 28, 1961) is a reporter for CNBC, based at the Nasdaq MarketSite in Times Square. She covers business and financial news stories.

Coombs attended The Park School in Brookline, Massachusetts, Milton Academy in Milton, Massachusetts, and Yale University in New Haven, Connecticut.

Prior to joining CNBC, she worked at ABC News as a reporter and news anchor, covering such stories as the Clinton impeachment, the Kosovo War, Hurricane Floyd, Rudy Giuliani's troubled marriage, and the John F. Kennedy, Jr. plane crash.

She was Milton Academy's graduation speaker in 2005.

See also
 New Yorkers in journalism

References

1961 births
Living people
Milton Academy alumni
Yale University alumni
American business and financial journalists
American women journalists
American reporters and correspondents
CNBC people
Women business and financial journalists
ABC News personalities
21st-century American women